Sam Fenwick (born 9 September 1992) is a Welsh male squash player. He achieved his highest career ranking of 214 in September 2017, during the 2017 PSA World Tour.

References 

1992 births
Living people
Welsh male squash players
Sportspeople from Caerphilly